Lai Sheng-jung is a Taiwanese softball player. She carried Chinese Taipei's Olympic Flag at the 2008 Summer Olympics in Beijing.

References

Olympic softball players of Taiwan
Taiwanese softball players
Softball players at the 2004 Summer Olympics
Softball players at the 2008 Summer Olympics
Living people
People from Miaoli County
Asian Games medalists in softball
Softball players
Softball players at the 1998 Asian Games
Softball players at the 2002 Asian Games
Softball players at the 2006 Asian Games
Medalists at the 1998 Asian Games
Medalists at the 2002 Asian Games
Medalists at the 2006 Asian Games
Asian Games silver medalists for Chinese Taipei
Asian Games bronze medalists for Chinese Taipei
Year of birth missing (living people)
20th-century Taiwanese women